Murmansk Shipping Company, often abbreviated as MSCO, is a Russian shipping company based in Murmansk (hence the name). One of the primary shipping companies operating in Arctic Russia and northern Europe, as of 2014 the company has 303 vessels, with a total deadweight of about 1.2 million tons. The company runs a notable museum in Murmansk.

History
The company was established in 1939 as the Murmansk State Dry-Cargo and Passenger Shipping Company, and was renamed to its present name in 1967. It specialised in arctic transportation, and by 1940 it had 37 vessels with a total deadweight of 112,200 tons. During World War II its carriers served as allied escorts. It performs passenger as well as cargo navigation. In 1973, the Northern Fleet and the Murmansk Shipping Company commenced transporting spent nuclear fuel by barges to Murmansk, and then delivering it to Mayak by train. In 1977, one of its ships, the nuclear-powered icebreaker Arktika, reached the North Pole for the first time. 

The company was reorganized into the Joint Stock Company in 1993. At this time the company faced significant criticism from environmentalists which culminated from the Yablokov Report, drawn up by presidential adviser Aleksey Yablokov, which revealed that the Northern Fleet and the Murmansk Shipping Company had dumped some 2.5 million curies of liquid and solid radioactive waste in the Arctic Ocean between 1959 and 1991. In 1996 the Murmansk Shipping Company reported 3,100 fuel assemblies were stored on the service ship Lotta.

Facilities
The main operating facility of the company is at Atomflot, to the north of the city on the Murmansk Fjord. The base contains liquid and solid waste processing systems, warehouses for shipping supplies and workshops etc. The ships are maintained at the dry docks in Murmansk, and the Zvezdochka shipyard in Severodvinsk also makes repairs to the reactors of the nuclear-powered icebreakers.

Museum

The Murmansk Shipping Company Museum on Volodarskogo Street in Murmansk, established in 1977, has an extensive collection of artifacts related to its history and Russian naval history. Among its displays are photographs of polar captains, ship bells, micro model replicas, marine equipment, with one section dedicated entirely to icebreakers and their history. Icebreakers represented by particularly fine models include Yermak (1898), Fyodor Litke (1909), Sedov (1909), Alexander Sibiryakov (1909), Sadko (1913), Semyon Dezhnov (1939), Severny Veter (1944), Lenin (1959), Kiev (1965), Artika (1972), Krasin (1976), Kapitan Dranitsyn (1980), Vladmimir Ignatyuk (1983), Rossiya (1985) and Taymyr (1989).

Past and present vessels
As of 2014 the company has 303 vessels, with a total deadweight of about 1.2 million tons. A selected number of ships are shown below:
Indiga and Varzuga, Finnish icebreaking product tankers purchased in 2003
A number of SA-15 type Arctic multipurpose cargo ships, two of which remain in service (Kapitan Danilkin and Yuriy Arshenevskiy)
Sevmorput, the last nuclear-powered cargo ship previously operated by Murmansk Shipping Company
Vladimir Ignatyuk, an icebreaker purchased from Canada
Kotlas, a 1989-built tanker
Kuzma Minin, a 1980-built bulk carrier
Volodarsky, the oldest vessel of the fleet (launched in 1929) used to transport and store radioactive waste

References

External links

Official Murmansk Shipping Company website—

 
Shipping companies of Russia
Russian brands
Shipping companies of the Soviet Union
Transport companies established in 1939
1939 establishments in the Soviet Union
1939 establishments in Russia
Companies based in Murmansk Oblast